A Quinta (English: The Farm) is the third season of the Portuguese version of the reality show The Farm, which was broadcast by TVI. The last two seasons were known as Quinta das Celebridades (English: Farm of Celebrities) and ran between 2004 and 2005. The format came back 10 years after, however this time it'll have a mix of celebrities and anonymous contestants. Teresa Guilherme will be the host, unlike last two seasons which had Júlia Pinheiro as the host. The applications officially opened on July 28. Applications were supposed to end on August 31, however probably due to a low number of applications it was postponed to September 15, when they finally ended. After some speculations that the season would premiere on the night of the legislative election, it was officially confirmed that it would premiere the day before, on October 3. There will be a 24-hour channel, however this time it'll be exclusive of NOS. The final prize money for the winner is €20,000.

Contestants 
The original contestants of A Quinta were composed by 12 celebrities and 4 anonymous. Inês entered on Day 9 as the replacement of Liliana B., Luna entered on Day 23 as a new contestant and Érica entered on Day 37 as a leader and turned contestant at Day 65.

Angélica 
Angélica Jordão is 25 and comes from Loulé. She is an anonymous contestant, however she is friend with Cláudio from Secret Story 3. She entered the farm on Day 1. She was the ninth contestant to be evicted on Day 58 with 47% of the votes to save.

Carlos 
Carlos Costa is 23 and comes from Funchal, Madeira Islands. He is a celebrity contestant, becoming famous after his participation on the talent shows Ídolos and The Voice Portugal. He entered the farm on Day 1, and is already known for his unique style. He was the fourth contestant to be evicted on Day 30 with 49% of the votes.

Érica 
Érica Silva is 26 and comes from Ribeira Brava, Madeira, where she is a hairdresser. He is a celebrity contestant, becoming famous after she was a housemate in Secret Story 4, and eventually won Desafio Final 2 (All-Stars edition) after coming back again for Desafio Final 3. She entered the farm on Day 37 as a guest leader, and on Day 65 the public was asked if they wanted Érica as a contestant or not. The "yes" option won with 57%, and she turned out a contestant. She was the twelfth contestant to be evicted on Day 79 with 12% of the votes to save.

Gonçalo 
Gonçalo Quinaz is 30 and comes from Odivelas. He is an anonymous contestant, however he is a football player and already appeared on the press for having a son with Nereida. He entered the farm on Day 1 and as an anonymous contestant. He became a finalist on Day 86. On the finale on Day 90 he finished in 4th place with 11% of the votes.

Inês 
Inês Monteiro is 19 and comes from Paredes, and is a solarium assistant. She entered the farm on Day 9 as the replacement of Liliana, and is an anonymous contestant. She was the fifth contestant to be evicted on Day 37 with 15% of the votes to save.

Kelly 
Kelly Medeiros is 31 and comes from Almenara, Brazil. She is a celebrity contestant, becoming famous after her participation on Big Brother Brasil 12. She entered the farm on Day 1. She became a finalist on Day 86. On the finale on Day 90 she was declared as the winner with 50% of the votes.

Larama 
Luis "Larama" Andrade is 37 and comes from Luanda, Angola. He is a celebrity contestant, becoming famous after being the winner of Big Brother Angola 1. He entered the farm on Day 1. He was the third contestant to be evicted on Day 23 with 58% of the votes. He re-entered the farm on Day 44, but only as a guest and left on Day 86.

Liliana 
Liliana Aguiar is 35 and comes from Vila Nova de Gaia. She is a celebrity contestant, becoming famous after her participation on Big Brother 3. She was the seventh contestant to be evicted on Day 44 with 35% of the votes to save.

Liliana B. 
Liliana Bastos is 23 and comes from Guimarães. She is an anonymous contestant, and is a student. She entered the farm on Day 1. She was ejected on Day 3 for aggressive behaviour and by physical aggression towards Larama. She re-entered the farm on Day 51, to replace Marta but only as a guest and left the farm on Day 58 after a public vote in which her exit was decided with 74%.

Luna 
Maria "Luna" Vambano is 23 and comes from Luanda, Angola. She is a celebrity contestant, becoming famous after being the winner of Big Brother Angola 2. She entered the farm on Day 23. She was the eleventh contestant to be evicted on Day 72 with 37% of the votes to save.

Marta 
Marta Cruz is 31. She is a celebrity contestant, becoming famous for being the daughter of the arrested television presenter Carlos Cruz. She entered the farm on Day 1. She walked on Day 51 to resolve family issues. She re-entered the farm on Day 53 as a full contestant, after she was able to resolve quickly the issue. She became the first finalist of the season on Day 79, after she had the most votes to save on the weekly eviction. On the finale on Day 90 she finished as the runner-up with 22% of the votes.

Merche 
Merche Romero is 38. She is a celebrity contestant, becoming famous for being a television host and model. She also participated on the Portuguese version of Your Face Sounds Familiar. She entered the farm on Day 1 with her brother Santiago. She was the eighth contestant to be evicted on Day 51 with 43% of the votes to save.

Paulo 
Paulo Freitas do Amaral is 37 and comes from Oeiras, Portugal. He is a celebrity contestant, becoming famous after being the youngest president of a Junta de Freguesia, and is also a candidate to the 2016 presidential elections, but later withdrew. He entered the farm on Day 1. He was the first contestant to be evicted on Day 9 with 49% of the votes.

Pedro 
Pedro Barros is 25 and comes from Charneca da Caparica. He is an anonymous contestant, and is a model. He entered the farm on Day 1 and as an anonymous contestant. He was the sixth contestant to be evicted on Day 37 on a surprise double eviction, with 45% of the votes to save.

Romana 
Carla "Romana" Sousa is 34 and comes from Lisbon. She is a celebrity contestant, becoming famous for being a singer. She also participated on Big Brother Famosos and the Portuguese version of Your Face Sounds Familiar. She became a finalist on Day 86. On the finale on Day 90 he finished in 3rd place with 17% of the votes.

Rúben 
Rúben da Cruz is 28 and comes from Costa da Caparica. He is a celebrity contestant, becoming famous for being a DJ. He entered the farm on Day 1. He was ejected on Day 53 after he broke the rules and talked to his mother, who was talking with him outside of the farm.

Santiago 
Tiago "Santiago" Gomes is 30 and comes from Madrid, Spain. He is a celebrity contestant, becoming famous for being an actor. He entered the farm on Day 1 with his sister Merche. He was the thirteenth contestant to be evicted on Day 86 with 8% of the votes to save.

Sara 
Sara Norte is 30. She is a celebrity contestant, becoming famous for being an actress and being the daughter of the also actor Vítor Norte. She is also known for being arrested for possession of drugs for one year and a half. She entered the farm on Day 1. She was the second contestant to be evicted on Day 16 with 42% of the votes.

Saúl 
Saúl Ricardo is 28 and comes from Figueira da Foz. He is a celebrity contestant, becoming famous for being a singer. He entered the farm on Day 1. He was the tenth contestant to be evicted on Day 65 with 31% of the votes to save.

Nominations table

Notes 
 :  All anonymous (Angélica, Gonçalo and Pedro) and foreign contestants (Kelly and Larama) are immune for this week and exempt to nominate.
 : For this nominations, females nominate male housemates in the first round. Paulo received the most votes and was automatically nominated. In the second round, the remaining male housemates competed in a task where they should catch eggs in a haystack. Carlos and Rúben caught fewer eggs and joined Paulo as the nominees.
 :  Angélica and Merche were immune as farm leaders. Inês was immune and exempt to nominate as a new contestant.
 : Nominations were done face-to-face this week. For the first round, males nominated females. There was a tie between Romana, Sara and Liliana. As a guest, Cinha broke the tie and nominated Sara. For the second round, females nominated females. Romana had the most nominations and was nominated. For the third round, everyone nominated females. Kelly had the most nominations and was nominated.
 : Nominations were done face-to-face this week. For the first round, females nominated males. Larama received the most nominations and is the first nominee. For the second round, males nominated males. There was a tie between Carlos, Pedro and Saúl. As a guest, Cinha broke the tie and nominated Pedro. For the third round, everyone nominated males. Carlos and Gonçalo received the most nominations and are the last nominees.
 :  Luna was immune and exempt to nominate as a new contestant.
 : Nominations were done face-to-face this week. For the first round, males nominated females. Angélica received the most nominations and is the first nominee. For the second round, females nominated males. There was a tie between Carlos and Pedro. As a guest, Cinha broke the tie and nominated Carlos. For the third round, everyone could nominate everyone. Romana received the most nominations and is the last nominees.
 :  The public voted on the app for who had the best dance, Kelly or Luna. Luna had the most votes and therefore won immunity. Merche and Rúben also won immunity but only at Day 32 rounds for being the farm leaders.
 : The first round was done on Sunday, Day 30 (in bold) and everyone could nominate everyone face-to-face. Inês received the most nominations and is the first nominee. The rest of the rounds were done on Tuesday, Day 32 and all done face-to-face. For the second round, females nominated each other. Romana received the most nominations and is the second nominee. For the third round, males nominated each other. There was a tie between Pedro and Saúl. As farm leaders, Merche and Rúben broke the tie and nominated Saúl. For the fourth round, everyone could nominate everyone. There was a tie between Liliana and Santiago. As Merche and Rúben couldn't break the tie both were nominated and a save round was done. Everyone could vote to save one of the nominees exempt the nominees themselves. Inês couldn't be saved as she was nominated on Day 30. Everyone exempt Merche voted to save Liliana, and therefore she saved herself. The public vote is also to save.
 :  There was a double eviction on Day 37, and for the second eviction the nominees were the ones voted as the most lazy (Liliana and Pedro).
 :  Merche decided to give immunity to Romana to listen her son's message. Merche won immunity after she was saved by guest Érica on the first round.
 : The first round was done on Sunday, Day 37 (in bold) and everyone had to nominate 2 females face-to-face. Merche and Luna received the most nominations and Érica as a guest decided to save Merche. The rest of the rounds were done on Tuesday, Day 39 and all done face-to-face. For the second round, females nominated each other. Liliana received the most nominations and is the second nominee. For the third round, males nominated females. Kelly received the most nominations and is the third nominee. After this, a save round was done and the nominees couldn't vote. As Luna was nominated on Day 37. Kelly received the most votes and was saved, with 5 votes (Angélica, Merche, Rúben, Santiago and Saúl). Liliana had 3 votes (Marta, Romana and Gonçalo). The public vote is again to save.
 : Nominations were done face-to-face this week. For the first round, females nominated each other. There was a tie between Angélica and Romana. As guests, Érica and Gisela broke the tie and nominated Romana. For the second round, males nominated females. There was a tie between Kelly, Luna, Marta and Merche. As guests, Érica and Gisela broke the tie and nominated Merche. For the third round, everyone nominated a female. Luna and Marta received the most nominations and were nominated. The public vote is again to save.
 :  Gonçalo broke systematically the rules for having regular contact with the outside world. As a result, a new vote was opened to either evict or save Gonçalo.
 :  Angélica was automatically nominated for breaking the rules and let Rúben know his mother wanted to talk to him outside of the farm.
 : Nominations were done face-to-face this week. For the first round, everyone nominated males. Saúl received the most nominations and is the second nominee. For the second round, everyone nominated females. Kelly received the most nominations and is the third nominee. For the third round, everyone could nominate everyone. Luna received the most nominations and is the last nominee. However, the guests leaders (Érica and Gisela) could save one of the nominees. They decided to save Saúl.
 : Nominations were done face-to-face this week. For the first round, everyone nominated males. Saúl received the most nominations and is the first nominee. For the second round, everyone nominated females. Luna received the most nominations and is the second nominee. For the third round, everyone nominated females. Kelly received the most nominations and is the last nominee.
 :  Contestants and guests voted for the most manipulative and useless contestant. As most manipulative, Gonçalo was banned from nominating. As most useless, Romana's nominations counted as double.
 :  Érica was immune and exempt to nominate as she became a contestant on Sunday.
 : Nominations were done face-to-face this week, only females could be nominated for being only 2 males in the farm and everyone could nominate. In the first round, Kelly received the most nominations and is the first nominee. In the second round, Luna received the most nominations and is the second nominee. In the third round, Marta received the most nominations and is the third nominee. However, Sofia as the guest leader could save one of the nominees. She decided to save Marta.
 :  All females were automatically nominated because of the gender imbalance on the farm.
 :  Marta received the most votes on the Week 11's eviction and won a passport to the finale, being therefore the first finalist.
 :  Everyone is automatically nominated exempt Marta, who won a pass to the finale.
 : There could be a double eviction on Day 86. However, if the current contestants and ex-contestants could pass several challenges there would be only one eviction. They passed the task.
 : The public voted for who they wanted to win.

Nominations total received

Nominations: Results

Team of the farm

Twists

Guests/Leaders 
Some guests entered the farm to take the place of leader and boss, instructing the contestants on their daily works. Other guests were simply guests, and did not have any role or defined task.

Ratings and Reception

Live Eviction Shows

References

External links 

  

Television series by Endemol
The Farm (franchise)
2015 Portuguese television seasons